Solon is a masculine given name which may refer to:

 Solon (c. 630–c. 560 BC), Athenian statesman, lawmaker and poet
 Solon Irving Bailey (1854–1931), American astronomer
 Solon Barnett (1921–1998), American football player
 Solon Spencer Beman (1853–1914), American architect
 Solon Bixler (born 1977), American indie rock musician and singer
 Solon Borglum (1868–1922), American sculptor
 Solon Borland (1808–1864), United States senator and physician
 Solon J. Buck (1884–1962), Second Archivist of the United States
 Solon Chase (1823–1909), American farmer, orchardist, politician and newspaper publisher
 Solon Gikas (1898–1978), Greek Army lieutenant general, Chief of the Hellenic Army General Staff and government minister
 Solon Toothaker Kimball (1909–1982), American educator and anthropologist
 Solon Ménos (1859–1918), Haitian author and politician
 Solon Michaelides (1905–1979), Cypriot composer, teacher and musicologist
 Solon D. Neal (1846–1920), American soldier awarded the Medal of Honor
 Solon Peppas (born 1974), Greek former tennis player
 Solon Robinson (1803–1880), American writer, journalist and agriculturist

Masculine given names